The Helvetic Guards are an American football team based in Zurich, Switzerland. The team starts in the 2023 season in the European League of Football (ELF).

History
The entry of the newly founded franchise into the professional league was announced on 13 May 2022, during a press conference to open the 2022 ELF season by the team's general manager Toni Zöller. Together with co-owner Mukadder Erdönmez and others they established the first ELF franchise in Switzerland.

On 26 August 2022, the team announced Norm Chow as the head coach for the European League of Football 2023 season.

On 30 October 2022 the front office announced that they will play their home games in the Lidl Arena in Wil, Switzerland, about 25 miles (40km) eastern of Zürich.

On 2 December 2022, the team signed Colin Hill to be their starting quarterback. They added fellow US-American running back and wide receiver Silas Nacita on 17 December 2022.

Staff

References

External links 
 Official Website

European League of Football teams
American football teams in Switzerland
2022 establishments in Switzerland
American football teams established in 2022
Sport in Zürich